Safina Erkinovna Sadullayeva (born 4 March 1998) is an Uzbek athlete. She competed in the women's high jump event at the 2020 Summer Olympics.

At the 2022 World Indoor Championships in Belgrade (Serbia), she took sixth place with a score of 192 cm.

At the 2022 World Athletics Championships in Oregon (United States), she took fifth place with a repetition of a personal best (196 cm). Sadullayeva became the best among all Asian jumpers.

International competitions

References

External links
 

1998 births
Living people
Uzbekistani female high jumpers
Athletes (track and field) at the 2020 Summer Olympics
Olympic athletes of Uzbekistan
Place of birth missing (living people)
21st-century Uzbekistani women
Islamic Solidarity Games medalists in athletics